My Angel is a 2011 British Christmas film written, directed and produced by Stephen Cookson. Starring Timothy Spall, Brenda Blethyn, Celia Imrie, Mel Smith and introducing Joseph Phillips, it tells the story of a boy, played by the last, looking for an angel to save his mother after an accident. Shot in Northwood for less than £2 million, My Angel scooped best film, newcomer, director, producer, screenplay, plus best actor and actress for Blethyn and Spall at the Monaco International Film Festival. Re-titled as Christmas Angel and released on DVD in the UK on 4 November 2013.  Released in the US by BBC Home Entertainment on 19 November 2013.

Plot
Fifteen-year-old Eddie (Joseph Phillips) is on a shopping trip with his mother when she is tragically struck by a car and left in critical condition. With their father absent from their lives, Eddie and his brother Stewart (Angus Harrison) face the daunting prospect of potentially losing their mother just as Christmas approaches. One night, Eddie's mother visits him in a dream urging him to find a halo so that she may be saved. Stewart scoffs at Eddie's "childish" dream and the only person Eddie can turn to is the grumpy Mr Lambert (Spall), from his school. Will Eddie be able to find an angel and save his mother before Christmas?

Cast
 Joseph Phillips — Eddie
 Brenda Blethyn — Headmistress
 Timothy Spall — Mr Lambert
 Mel Smith — Uncle Richard
 Celia Imrie — The Librarian
 Angus Harrison — Stewart

Reception

Accolades

References

External links
 
 My Angel on the C K Films website

2011 films
British drama films
2010s English-language films
2010s British films